Tuticorin Airport  is a domestic airport located  from Thoothukudi, Tamil Nadu, serving the districts of Thoothukkudi, Tirunelveli, Tenkasi, and Kanniyakumari in southern Tamil Nadu. It was inaugurated by the former Chief Minister of Tamil Nadu J. Jayalalithaa on 30 April 1992 and the former Minister of State for Civil Aviation and Tourism of the Republic of India M. O. H. Farook presided with her. The airport was ISO 9001:2015 quality certified on 13 April 2018. It is the fifth busiest airport in Tamil Nadu after Chennai, Coimbatore, Tiruchirappalli, and Madurai.

Structure

The airport has two parking bays. Stand 1 is to the east of the apron, and Stand 2 is to the west. Stand No. 1 for an ATR 72 or lesser type of ACFT, and stand No. 2 for a Bombardier Q400 or lesser type of ACFT. while its terminal building can handle 120 passengers during peak hours. Navigational aids at Tuticorin airport include NDB TU, PAPI lights, and an aerodrome beacon. The DGCA has granted it a higher category license, moving it from VFR to IFR on 30 June 2020. The air traffic control tower is located to the north of Apron and has Aerodrome Control (ADC), Surface Movement Control (SMC), and Approach Control (APP) units. The air traffic services unit is provided with meteorological information.

Expansion
A master plan for upgrading the airport in phases had been prepared by the Ministry of Civil Aviation. Government of Tamil Nadu has handed over 600.97 acres of land free from encumbrance to the Airports Authority of India on 31 December 2018 for the expansion. An additional 110 acres of land have been set aside for the Indian Air Force and the Indian Coastguard. As part of the 96.77 crore expansion project initiated on 25 July 2020 the following activities are planned:

 New isolation bay for Code C aircraft and a  taxi link way.

Night landing facilities were established at the airport on 29 June 2020, and their first operation began on 3 July 2020 at 7 p.m., via IndiGo Airlines.

In September 2020, the Airports Authority of India stated that it is initiating a project that includes widening the runway, constructing a new air traffic control tower, and constructing a new terminal building at a total cost of 381 crore. It will be operational by March 2023. The new terminal building will cover an area of 13,530 square metres and be able to handle 600 passengers during peak hours. A new ATC tower, a technical block, a fire station, an isolation bay, aprons, and five aircraft parking bays for A-320 type aircraft are also part of the project.

Airlines and destinations

Naming the airport
 After the death of former president of the Republic of India A. P. J. Abdul Kalam, there have been requests to name the airport "Dr. A. P. J. Abdul Kalam International Airport" after the approval of international status by the Union Cabinet.
 An Indian actor turned politician and former member of parliament R. Sarathkumar's All India Samathuva Makkal Katchi made a request to name the airport after the former chief minister of Tamil Nadu K. Kamaraj, as "Kamarajar International Airport" after the approval of international status by the Union Cabinet.

References

External links
Official site at the Airports Authority of India

Airports in Tamil Nadu
Transport in Thoothukudi
Airports established in 1992
1992 establishments in Tamil Nadu
20th-century architecture in India